David Alexander Crawford AO is a prominent Australian non-executive director.

Education
He was educated at Scotch College, Melbourne and the University of Melbourne where he graduated with a Bachelor of Commerce and a Bachelor of Laws from Melbourne Law School.

Career
His directorships have included:
Chairman of Foster's Group
Chairman of Lendlease
Chairman of National Foods
Chairman of KPMG Australia
Director of BHP
Director of Westpac
Chairman of the Australian Ballet
Chairman of South32
Vice-President (and formerly Treasurer) of the Melbourne Cricket Club

Crawford served as Council Member and Chairman of the private school Scotch College, Melbourne.

Crawford has also headed inquiries for the Australian Government which reviewed the Australian Football League and Football Federation Australia.

2003 Report of the Independent Soccer Review Committee

Crawford was the head of the committee formed by the Australian government that oversaw several changes to football (soccer) in Australia. The review is commonly known as "The Crawford Report".

Awards and recognition 
In the 2009 Queen's Birthday Honours Crawford was made an Officer of the Order of Australia (AO) for "service to business as a director of public companies, to sport, particularly through the review and restructure of national sporting bodies, and to the community through contributions to arts and educational organisations".

References

Australian businesspeople
Lendlease
Living people
People educated at Scotch College, Melbourne
University of Melbourne alumni
Officers of the Order of Australia
Recipients of the Centenary Medal
Year of birth missing (living people)